Sarava (foaled March 2, 1999 in Kentucky) is an American Thoroughbred racehorse best known for winning the 2002 Belmont Stakes.

Background
Sired by the 1984 Breeders' Cup Classic winner Wild Again, Sarava was out of the mare Rhythm of Life, a daughter of Canadian Horse Racing Hall of Fame inductee and two-time Leading sire in North America, Deputy Minister.

Racing career
Sarava was purchased for $250,000 at the Fasig-Tipton sale. Sent to race in England, he failed to win in three starts as a 2-year-old. Returned to the United States the fall, under trainer Burk Kessinger, the colt won his American debut in November.

Given over to Kenneth McPeek for conditioning early in his three-year-old season, after a modest 2002 spring campaign he won the Sir Barton Stakes at Pimlico Race Course by four lengths under jockey Edgar Prado. Sarava and Prado then won the Belmont Stakes at record odds of 70:1, ending the bid by Kentucky Derby and Preakness Stakes winner War Emblem to capture the U.S. Triple Crown.  The race was witnessed by 103,222, which was the biggest crowd in Belmont Park history.

Stud record
In 2005 Sarava began stud duty at Cloverleaf Farms II in Reddick, Florida. Mated to the mare Watch Closely, whose grandsire was Mr. Prospector, his first foal, Avaras, was born in 2007.

Retirement
On September 29, 2012, 13-year-old Sarava arrived at Old Friends Equine, a non-profit Thoroughbred retirement facility in Georgetown, Kentucky.

References

External links
 Sarava's pedigree and partial racing stats
 Video at YouTube of Sarava winning the 2002 Belmont Stakes
 Sarava info at Old Friends Equine

1999 racehorse births
Racehorses bred in Kentucky
Racehorses trained in the United States
Belmont Stakes winners
Thoroughbred family 10-c
Old Friends Equine Retirement